General Sir Arthur James Herbert KCB (21 January 1820 – 24 November 1897) was a Welsh officer in the British Army who was Quartermaster-General to the Forces.

Early life and education

Herbert was born in Llansantffraed, Monmouthshire, the second son of James A. Jones of Llanarth, Monmouthshire, and Lady Harriet Plunkett, daughter of Arthur Plunkett, 8th Earl of Fingall, a prominent  Irish Roman Catholic peer. He was educated at Prior Park Roman Catholic College and Christ Church, Oxford, earning a B.A. in 1877 and M.A. in 1882.

Along with other members of his family, he changed his surname to Herbert in 1848.

Military career
Herbert was commissioned into the 23rd Regiment of Foot of the Royal Welsh Fusiliers in 1839. 

He rose through the officer ranks becoming a Major in 1854. He served in the Crimean War and made sketches of the action.

In 1856 he was appointed Deputy Quartermaster-General in the Ionian Islands before becoming Assistant Adjutant-General at Headquarters.

He was appointed Quartermaster-General to the Forces in 1882 and retired in 1887.

Personal life
In Southampton in 1854, Herbert married Elizabeth Hill Ferguson, the daughter of Charles John Hill and widow of Captain George Ferguson, of Houghton Hall, Carlisle, Cumberland.

He died at his home after a long illness.

References

 

|-

1820 births
1897 deaths
Welsh Roman Catholics
Welsh people of Irish descent
People educated at Prior Park College
Alumni of Christ Church, Oxford
British Army generals
Knights Commander of the Order of the Bath
Royal Welch Fusiliers officers